Andrew Jack may refer to:

 Andrew Jack (dialect coach) (1944–2020), British dialect coach and actor
 Andrew Jack (censor), Chief Censor of New Zealand
 Andrew Keith Jack (1885–1966), Australian physicist
 Andy Jack (born 1923), football centre forward